Nathan Conroy (born 6 March 1995) is an English professional rugby league footballer who last played as a  for the Hunslet RLFC in Betfred League 1. 

He has previously played for the Bradford Bulls, and played on loan from Bradford at Oxford in League 1 and the Dewsbury Rams in the Championship. A permanent move to Dewsbury was followed by two seasons at the Keighley Cougars in League 1.

Playing career

Bradford Bulls
Conroy has been involved in the Bradford Bulls scholarship system from the under 15s and was given a 2-year professional contract midway through the 2013 season.

2013
He featured in round 27 against the Huddersfield Giants.

2014
Conroy featured in the pre-season games against Hull FC, Dewsbury Rams and Castleford Tigers.

Conroy featured in round 10 (Wigan Warriors) and round 14 (Catalans Dragons). Conroy also played in round 27, against the London Broncos. He featured in round 4 of the Challenge Cup against Oldham.

Despite their relegation to the Championship, he signed a new 1-year contract with the Bulls.

2015
Conroy featured in the pre-season friendlies against Castleford Tigers and Leeds Rhinos.

He played in round 5, against the Batley Bulldogs.

At the end of the season Conroy made his loan move to the Dewsbury Rams a permanent one.

Dewsbury Rams
Conroy featured in round 1 (Swinton Lions), round 2 and round 3 (Oldham). He also played in round 5 (Featherstone Rovers), round 8 (Sheffield Eagles) and round 9 (Leigh Centurions). Conroy played in the Challenge Cup in round 4 against the Bradford Bulls.

Keighley Cougars
He joined the Keighley Cougars for 2017.

It was rumoured that Conroy has signed for Hull F.C. on a trial basis.

Coventry Bears
On 23 Nov 2018 it was reported that Conroy would join the Coventry Bears.

Hunslet RLFC
On 12 January 2020 it was reported that Conroy had signed for Hunslet.

References

External links

Dewsbury Rams profile
Bradford Bulls profile

1995 births
Living people
Bradford Bulls players
Cornwall RLFC players
Coventry Bears players
Dewsbury Rams players
English rugby league players
Hunslet R.L.F.C. players
Keighley Cougars players
Oxford Rugby League players
Rugby league hookers
Rugby league players from Bradford